The 2021–22 All-Ireland Intermediate Club Football Championship was the 18th staging of the All-Ireland Intermediate Club Football Championship since its establishment by the Gaelic Athletic Association for the 2003–04 season.

The All-Ireland final was played on 6 February 2022 at Croke Park in Dublin, between Steelstown and Trim. Steelstown won the match by 3-14 to 2-05 to claim their first ever championship title.

Connacht Intermediate Club Football Championship

Connacht quarter-final

Connacht semi-finals

Connacht final

Leinster Intermediate Club Football Championship

Leinster first round

Leinster quarter-finals

Leinster semi-finals

Leinster final

Munster Intermediate Club Football Championship

Munster quarter-finals

Munster semi-finals

Munster final

Ulster Intermediate Club Football Championship

Ulster final

All-Ireland Intermediate Club Football Championship

All-Ireland semi-finals

All-Ireland final

References

2021 in Irish sport
2022 in Irish sport
All-Ireland Intermediate Club Football Championship
All-Ireland Intermediate Club Football Championship